Shop Talk: A Writer and His Colleagues and Their Work is a collection of previously published interviews with important 20th-century writers by novelist Philip Roth. Among the writers interviewed are Primo Levi, Aharon Appelfeld, Ivan Klima, Isaac Bashevis Singer, Milan Kundera, and Edna O'Brien. In addition, the book contains a discussion with Mary McCarthy about Roth's novel The Counterlife and a New Yorker essay on Saul Bellow. Roth's trip to Israel to interview Appelfeld inspired his novel Operation Shylock.

Table of contents 
Conversation in New York with Isaac Bashevis Singer about Bruno Schulz, from The New York Times Book Review, 1976
Conversation in London and Connecticut with Milan Kundera, from The New York Times Book Review, 1980
Conversation in London with Edna O'Brien, from The New York Times Book Review, 1984
Pictures of Malamud, from The New York Times Book Review, 1986
A Man Saved by His Skills. Conversation in Turin with Primo Levi, from The New York Times Book Review, 12 ottobre 1986
Conversation in Jerusalem with Aharon Appelfeld, from The New York Times Book Review, 1988
Pictures of Guston, from Vanity Fair, 1989
Conversation in Prague with Ivan Klíma, from The New York Review of Books, 1990
An Exchange with Mary McCarthy, from The New Yorker, 1998
Rereading Saul Bellow, from The New Yorker, 2000

2001 non-fiction books
American anthologies
Books about writing
Books by Philip Roth
Houghton Mifflin books
Books of interviews